V. Irai Anbu is a 1988 batch Indian Administrative Service officer, writer, educator, social activist, and motivational speaker. He is the current Chief Secretary of Tamil Nadu Government.

Childhood 
Irai Anbu was born at Kattur village in Salem district on 16 June 1963. Born in a middle-class family, he wanted to live a well-intentioned life since his schooldays. His father's name is Venkatachalam and his Mother's name is Saroja. He has a brother named Thiruppugazh who is also an IAS Officer. He also has two sisters namely Paingili and Insuvai. The former is a College Professor whereas, the latter is a writer and English Professor.

Career 

 Irai Anbu began his career as Sub collector of Nagapattinam district. He played the main role in flood relief works.
 During his tenure as Sub collector in Nagapattinam district, he took all efforts to control riots in the district. As a measure to prevent riots during Kanthuri festival in Nagore Dargah, he stayed in the Dargah for a whole night. Also, during Ganesh Chaturti procession, he too walked with the procession as a step to prevent violence
 During his tenure as an Additional collector in Cuddalore district, he took steps to provide skill development training to prisoners who were in Cuddalore central prison It was seen as a great step towards reforming Prisoners.
 He also took steps to provide houses under District Decentralisation plan to Narikuravas in erstwhile South Arcot district.
 He was also appointed as a special officer for conducting 8th World Tamil Conference in Thanjavur at 1995. He served as coordinator for all committees during the conference
 He also served as deputy commissioner of municipal administration, Director of Information and Public Relations Department, District Collector of Kanchipuram district, Additional secretary to Chief Minister's secretariat, Secretary of Department of Information and Tourism, Secretary of Department of Tourism and Culture, Secretary of Department of Environment and Forests, Principal Secretary of Department of Economics and Statistics, Director of Entrepreneurship development Institute, Principal Secretary of Department of Human Resources development and Director of Anna Institute of Management.
 On 7 May 2021, he was appointed as the new Chief Secretary to Tamil Nadu Government.

Writer and motivational speaker 

Irai Anbu has been a motivational speaker and hosted a show named Kalloori Kaalangal in DD Pothigai in which he shared his experiences about his college life. He has written more than 150 books.

References 

1963 births
Living people
Indian Administrative Service officers